Scrobipalpa dalibori is a moth in the family Gelechiidae. It was described by Alexandr L. Lvovsky and Vladimir I. Piskunov in 1989. It is found in Mongolia.

References

Scrobipalpa
Moths described in 1989